William Joseph Ahern (2 March 1865 – 26 May 1938) was an Australian rules footballer who played one game for Carlton in the first season of the Victorian Football League (VFL) in 1897.

For many years he was believed to have been born in 1873 but this was found to be incorrect in 2016.

References

External links

Bill Ahern's profile at Blueseum

Australian rules footballers from Victoria (Australia)
VFL/AFL players born outside Australia
1865 births
1938 deaths
Carlton Football Club players
Preston Football Club (VFA) players
Irish players of Australian rules football
Irish emigrants to colonial Australia